Awatea is a Māori term meaning The dawning of a new day. 

 The Forsyth Barr Stadium at University Plaza in Dunedin, New Zealand, known during planning as "Awatea Street Stadium" after its location
 Awatea, a ship used for troop transportation in World War II
 Awatea, a 1969 play by Bruce Mason
 Awatea, a marque of bordeaux-variety red wine from Te Mata Estate vintnery

Awatea is also occasionally found as a unisex given name.